Idan Ofer (born 2 October 1955) is an Israeli billionaire businessman and philanthropist, with interests in shipping, energy, mining and sports. He is the founder of Eastern Pacific Shipping, and the principal of the Quantum Pacific Group, a holding company.  He is majority shareholder of the Israel Corporation, listed on the Tel Aviv Stock Exchange, as well as Kenon Holdings, listed on the Tel Aviv and New York Stock Exchange. He is also the owner of the Israeli holding company Lynav Holdings and the Dutch-based Ansonia Holdings. 

Ofer owns a 33% stake in Spain's La Liga association football club Atlético Madrid, and an 85% stake in Portugal's Primeira Liga association football club FC Famalicão.

As of August 2022, his net worth was estimated at US$11.0 billion.

Early life
Idan Ofer is the son of the late Israeli billionaire Sammy Ofer (originally Shmuel Herskovich) and Aviva Ofer. His father was an Israeli shipping magnate who immigrated to Israel from Romania. His older brother is Israeli businessman Eyal Ofer. His uncle is Yuli Ofer.

Ofer grew up in Haifa, Israel, to a family of Ashkenazi Jewish (Romanian-Jewish) descent. He was enlisted as to mandatory military service in the Israeli Navy, serving as deputy commander of a patrol boat. He graduated from the University of Haifa, Israel, with a Bachelor of Science in Economics and Shipping. He then received a Master's in Business Administration from the London Business School in the 1980s. He has been married four times. His fourth wife is Batia Ofer, a charity fundraiser. He has five children. They resided in Arsuf, Israel (near Tel Aviv) until 2013. His daughter Leigh Ofer resides in New York City; his other children reside in London.

Business career
He started his career by expanding the family shipping business in Hong Kong in the 1980s. He then worked in Singapore and the United States. In 1987, he founded Eastern Pacific Shipping, .

He is the principal of the Quantum Pacific Group, a Guernsey-based holding corporation, and the Israel Corporation, one of the largest public holding listed on the Tel Aviv Stock Exchange. He served as the Chairman of the Israel Corporation from 1999 to 2010, and as a member of its board of directors from 1999 to 2013. He has served on the Advisory Boards of Synergy Ventures and Aspect Enterprise Solutions. He was an investor in Better Place, an electric car company which went bankrupt in May 2013.

In 2014, he established Kenon Holdings as a spin off from the Israel Corporation. It is a holding company primarily focused on growth-orientated businesses in the automotive and energy industries. It inherited some of the investments previously held by the Israel Corporation, such as Qoros, a joint project created in partnership with Chery Automobile that manufactures automobiles aimed towards a 'young, internationally minded' market in China. Other investments include Zim Integrated Shipping Services and IC Power. It also includes Inkia Energy, a Peruvian energy company and subsidiary of the IC Power. Meanwhile, the Israel Corporation retains investments in Oil Refineries and Israel Chemicals.

He serves on the advisory board of the Council on Foreign Relations and the Dean's Council of the John F. Kennedy School of Government at Harvard University. With Richard Branson and others, he is a co-founder of the Carbon War Room, a think tank on climate change based in Washington, D.C. According to The Financial Times, he is "a Tel Aviv liberal in the mould of the old Israeli Labour party."

After his father's death in 2011, he inherited half his father's fortune and collection of modern art. As a result, by 2013, he was the richest man in Israel. According to Forbes, Ofer has a net worth of $11 billion.

In March 2022 Israel Corp controlled by Idan Ofer, sold 20.17 million shares at $10.90 per share for an overall $220 million.

Sports 
In 2018, Ofer purchased a 51% stake via Quantum Pacific Group in Portuguese second league football club FC Famalicão, which he subsequently increased to 85% in 2019. In 2019, Famalicão was promoted to the top-tier football league in Portugal, the Primeira Liga.

Ofer also owns a 33% stake in Spain's La Liga football club Atlético Madrid.

Controversies 
Ofer has come under fire in Israel for moving to London for tax considerations, for pollution from his chemical factories, and for his lavish lifestyle.

In 2014, he allegedly paid Israeli espionage company Black Cube to track down information on then Israeli Finance Minister Yair Lapid and other government officials in a bid to influence tax policy.

In 2021, he was nominated as the businessman with 6 companies at the top of the Ministry of Environmental Protection's red list

Philanthropy
In 2013, Ofer donated £25 million to his alma mater the London Business School through the Idan and Batia Ofer Foundation. As a result of the charitable gift, the largest private donation the school has ever received, the LBS built the Sammy Ofer Centre in 2017 in honor of his father.

In 2017, Ofer and his wife Batia Ofer made charitable contributions to the Jewish Museum London.

Idan and Batia also launched a maritime scholarship fund in Singapore aiming  to award up to 10 full term scholarships per year in the maritime industry.

See also
List of Jews in sports (non-players)
List of Israelis

References 

Ashkenazi Jews

1955 births
Living people
University of Haifa alumni
Alumni of London Business School
Israeli businesspeople
Israeli businesspeople in shipping
Businesspeople from London
Israeli billionaires
Israeli people of Romanian-Jewish descent
Israeli philanthropists
Jewish philanthropists
Harvard Kennedy School people
Idan
People named in the Panama Papers
People named in the Paradise Papers
Ashkenazi Jews
Israeli Jews